The Secretary of State for Culture, Arts and Sports (informally Culture Secretary) is a Honduras secretary of State responsible for the formulation, coordination, implementation and evaluation of policies relating to research, rescue and dissemination of the cultural heritage, arts education and the identification, preservation and protection of historical and cultural heritage of the nation and all matters relating to the organization, promotion and development of sports.

History 

It was created in 1975 as Secretary of State in the Ministry of Culture, Tourism and Information, passing in your organization to bring together institutions like the National Library centennial Juan Ramon Molina and the National Archives of Honduras or the latest Manuel Bonilla and National Theater Institute Honduran Anthropology and History.
Annually awarded various prizes as incentives and recognition to the artistic and cultural production in Honduras, such as Laurel Leaf award in Gold and National Art Prize Pablo Zelaya Sierra, African Heritage Award, National Award for Voluntary Cultural and since 2006 the National Prize for Fiction Children and Youth.
From 1990 to 2007, the Ministry of Culture, Arts and Sports together with the Cultural Center of Spain in Tegucigalpa and the National School of Fine ArtesDesam convened every November 15 Anthology of Visual Arts of Honduras2 to encourage and document the annual creativity and enhance the social projection ENBA Also, each year paid tribute to a master of the Honduran plastic.

Social inclusion 

Secretary of State for Culture, Arts and Sports is working to preserve and improve cultural arts and traditions of honduran amerindian groups, among them Lenca, Miskito, Ch'orti', Tolupan, Pech or Paya Indians and Sumo or Tawahka and also Afro-Honduran population; Garifuna and Creoles.

See also 

 Art of Honduras
 Culture of Honduras
 Visual arts of Honduras
 Education in Honduras
 Sport in Honduras
 Escuela Nacional de Bellas Artes (Honduras)
 Honduran folklore
 Honduran cuisine
 Instituto Hondureño de Antropología e Historia
 Pre-Columbian Honduras
 History of Honduras
 Demographics of Honduras

References 

Government of Honduras
Politics of Honduras
Culture ministries